Juan Antonio Mayorga Ruano (born 1965, in Madrid) is a Spanish dramatist. He is best known in English-speaking countries for his 2004 play Himmelweg (Way to Heaven), which was brought to the London stage in June 2017 as part of the Festival of Spanish Theatre in London (Festelón).

Biography
Mayorga was born on April 6, 1965 and grew up in the Madrid neighborhood of Chamberí. Mayorga studied as a research fellow at the Institute of Philosophy of the Spanish National Research Council under the direction of the philosopher Reyes Mate, before furthering his studies in Münster, Berlin and Paris. He received a PhD in Philosophy in 1997 from the National University of Distance Education.

Mayorga is married and has three children.

Europe Theatre Prize 
In 2016, he was awarded the XIII Europe Prize Theatrical Realities, in Craiova, with the following motivation:Mayorga is a playwright. His work has crossed national boundaries to become established in major European theatres. A regular collaborator with theatre companies such as Animalario, he has also worked as an adaptor and dramatist for the Centro Dramático Nacional and the Compañía Nacional de Teatro Clasíco. When Mayorga writes his plays he “hears” the reaction of the audience. His plays question the audience, inviting them to adopt a position. The reader/spectator is always asked to “re-create” the meaning (or a meaning) of what happens on stage. This is not a provocation by the author but the audience’s judgement surfacing as the play unfolds. His plays have been shown in 18 countries and translated into 16 languages.

Works
His 2015 play Reykjavík involves a recreation of the World Chess Championship 1972 which took place in the Icelandic capital between Boris Spassky and Bobby Fischer. It has been adapted for radio and was broadcast on BBC Radio 3 in 2023.

References

1965 births
Living people
Spanish male dramatists and playwrights